The Australian of the Year Award is given annually on Australia Day. The announcement of the award has become a major public event in Australia, and is televised nationwide. The award "offers an insight into Australian identity, reflecting the nation's evolving relationship with world, the role of sport in Australian culture, the impact of multiculturalism, and the special status of Australia's Indigenous people". The award is unique in that it is sponsored by a national government and commands broad public support.

The following is a list of the recipients of the Australian of the Year award.

The post-nominals listed for each individual are as they were on the day they were named the Australian of the Year.

See also
 List of Senior Australian of the Year Award recipients
 List of Young Australian of the Year Award recipients
 List of Australian Local Hero Award recipients
 List of South Australian of the Year Award recipients
 List of Queensland Australian of the Year award recipients

References

Australian of the Year